Ntchiado is a village in the Bassar Prefecture in the Kara Region  of north-western Togo. As of 2016, it consisted of six large buildings and several small huts. It lies at an elevation of about 105 meters above sea level.

References

External links
Satellite map at Maplandia.com

Populated places in Kara Region
Bassar Prefecture